Patrick Leahy (17 March 1892 – 15 May 1966) was an Irish hurler who played as a midfielder for the Tipperary senior team.

Leahy made his first appearance for the team during the 1916 championship and was a regular member of the starting fifteen until his retirement after the 1927 championship. During that time he won two All-Ireland medals, four Munster medals and one National Hurling League medal.

At club level Leahy was a multiple county club championship medalist with Boherlahan–Dualla.

Leahy was the member of a hurling 'dynasty' in Tipperary. His older brother Johnny was a two-time All-Ireland-winning captain. His younger brothers, Mick and Tommy, also won All-Ireland medals.

In retirement from hurling Leahy became involved in coaching. He was chairman of the selection committee for eight All-Ireland victories for Tipperary between 1949 and 1965.

References

1892 births
1966 deaths
Boherlahan-Dualla hurlers
Tipperary inter-county hurlers
All-Ireland Senior Hurling Championship winners
Hurling selectors
Place of death missing